Luyang District is one of four urban districts of the prefecture-level city of Hefei, the capital of Anhui Province, East China. It makes up the main part of the old city area of Hefei.

Administrative divisions
Luyang District is divided to 12 subdistricts, 1 town and 1 township.
Subdistricts

Towns
Dayang

Townships
Sanshigang Township

References

External links
Luyang District Government website 

County-level divisions of Anhui
Hefei